Nowdeshah (also Romanized as Now Dasheh, Nowdesheh, Nūdsheh, and Naudsheh; also known as Naudesh and Nowcheh) is a Kurdish city in Nowsud District, Paveh County, Kermanshah Province, Iran.  At the 2006 census, its population was 3,548, in 968 families.

The town is famous for kllash, a type of footwear that is made by natural fabrics such as cow skin, cotton etc.

References

Populated places in Paveh County

Cities in Kermanshah Province
Kurdish settlements in Kermanshah Province